Finnsæter is a small village in Senja Municipality in Troms og Finnmark county, Norway. Finnsæter Chapel is located here, just off Norwegian County Road 86 as it passes through the village. The village is also the location of the Hulderheimen cultural centre with the Senja Troll family park.

References

Senja
Villages in Troms